Michigan's 103rd House of Representatives district (also referred to as Michigan's 103rd House district) is a legislative district within the Michigan House of Representatives located in parts of Benzie and Grand Traverse counties, as well as all of Leelanau County. The district was created in 1965, when the Michigan House of Representatives district naming scheme changed from a county-based system to a numerical one.

List of representatives

Recent Elections

Historical district boundaries

References 

Michigan House of Representatives districts
Crawford County, Michigan
Kalkaska County, Michigan
Missaukee County, Michigan
Ogemaw County, Michigan
Roscommon County, Michigan